Goodrington Sands is a sandy beach on the English Riviera, located at Goodrington, a coastal village on the outskirts of Paignton.

The beaches are gently shelving with a promenade at one end and rocks leading around to Oyster Cove at the other. The beach is split into two, South Sands & North Sands, by a minor headland, Middle Stone, that has a bar and restaurants overlooking the bay. North Sands (the promenade end) is very tidal and the sea comes up to the sea wall. South Sands has a much bigger expanse of soft sand and the sea seldom reaches over ½ up the beach and then only on Spring tides and in storms.

This mainly sandy beach with clean, calm waters has earned the prestigious Blue Flag Award and lifeguard patrols in the summer months make for safe swimming conditions. It is therefore a major attraction in the area, capable of supporting a very large number of visitors. Nearby are a Steam Railway Station, The Quaywest Water Park, The Seashore Centre, and Goodrington and Youngs Park, which is an area of established park land. During the summer season the local steam train can be seen running along the back of south sands beach.

Holday park
Beverley Holidays (1956–present) (3 parks of Beverley Park, Beverley Bay and Beverley View)

Gallery

References 

Beaches of Devon